The 1992 Hungarian Grand Prix was a Formula One motor race held at Hungaroring on 16 August 1992. It was the eleventh race of the 1992 Formula One World Championship.

The 77-lap race was won by Brazilian driver Ayrton Senna, driving a McLaren-Honda. Briton Nigel Mansell finished second in his Williams-Renault to clinch the Drivers' Championship with five races still to run, with Austrian Gerhard Berger third in the other McLaren-Honda. 

At the time, it was the earliest moment in F1 history the championship has been clinched before the final race. That record would be broken 10 years later when Michael Schumacher clinched the 2002 Formula One championship six races early.

The race also marked the final appearance of the Brabham team, which had been competing in Formula One since  and had won four Drivers' Championships and two Constructors' Championships.

Qualifying

Pre-qualifying report
After the previous Grand Prix in Germany, the Fondmetal team replaced Andrea Chiesa with Brabham driver Eric van de Poele. Brabham did not replace van de Poele and reduced their entry to one car. This meant the pre-qualifying pool could be reduced by one, and thus Larrousse driver Bertrand Gachot was no longer required to pre-qualify.

The session proved practically unnecessary as again, the Andrea Moda team did not make a serious attempt to run their second car, driven by Perry McCarthy. His team-mate Roberto Moreno had used both cars to pre-qualify, and McCarthy was only allowed to leave the pits 45 seconds before the end of the session, leaving him no chance to reach the start-finish line to begin a timed lap before the chequered flag was waved. This being the latest in a succession of similar incidents, FISA formally warned Andrea Moda to make a proper effort to run both cars at the next Grand Prix in Belgium, or face suspension from the following event in Italy.

The other four cars in the session thus all pre-qualified, with the Fondmetals taking the first two places as Gabriele Tarquini outpaced van de Poele by nearly a second. Ukyo Katayama was another second further back in the remaining Larrousse, with Moreno 1.1 seconds slower in fourth, only his second pre-qualification success this season. McCarthy was the sole entrant to fail to pre-qualify.

After the race the Brabham team withdrew entirely, removing the necessity for further pre-qualifying sessions. To date, this pre-qualifying session was the last to be held in Formula One.

Pre-qualifying classification

Qualifying report
This was the chance for Williams to seal both titles and they were dominant, but it was Patrese who took pole ahead of teammate Nigel Mansell, Ayrton Senna, Michael Schumacher, Gerhard Berger and Martin Brundle.

Qualifying classification

Race

Race report
At the start, Gerhard Berger passed Michael Schumacher, and then Mansell lost momentum and Senna passed him with Berger following his teammate through. The order was: Patrese, Senna, Berger, Mansell, Schumacher and Brundle.

There was a collision on the first lap between Érik Comas, Johnny Herbert, Thierry Boutsen and Gabriele Tarquini who all retired on the first lap (meaning both Ligiers of Comas and Boutsen retired on the first lap), before Eric van de Poele spun into retirement at the first corner on lap 3 as both Fondmetals retired after only two laps. Mansell passed Berger on lap 8 and set off after Senna. However, as hard as he tried, the combination of the small circuit and Senna's skills in defending meant that he could not pass. Another multi-car collision came on lap 14 which eliminated Bertrand Gachot, Aguri Suzuki, Olivier Grouillard, Karl Wendlinger and Stefano Modena (forcing all five drivers to retire on the same lap). Alesi in the leading Ferrari behind the leading pack spun out with the rear wheels in the gravel trap by lap 15. After these accidents which took place in three separate sections of the track - Modena's disabled Jordan blocking turn 13 was the most precariously positioned cars of all - the SC sign meaning the safety car was going to be deployed for the first time since the SC rule had been in place. Double yellow flags were waved around the track. Controversially, no further action was taken, and the safety car was never deployed. Murray Walker and James Hunt in the BBC booth phrased the situation "shambolic". On lap 31, Mansell made a mistake and went wide and rejoined behind Berger, just in the very moment when Murray Walker was talking about the track not providing any overtaking opportunities. Two laps later, Mansell passed Berger to get back third. Then, a pivotal movement came on lap 39 when Patrese spun off going into turn 3. He rejoined in seventh, outside the points which meant that Mansell would be the world champion if results stayed the same. However, on lap 61, Mansell had to go to the pits with tyre troubles and rejoined in sixth, just ahead of Patrese. Mansell quickly passed Häkkinen but before Patrese, who was right behind could take sixth, Patrese's engine blew. He was out and would get no points.

Mansell quickly caught and passed Brundle on lap 60 and four laps later, he was up to third when Michael Schumacher's rear wing broke on his Benetton, spinning him out and retired on lap 64. Senna, a minute at the front, made a precautionary stop just as Häkkinen passed Brundle for fourth. Mansell passed Berger for second and now had a toehold on the championship. Soon afterwards, Häkkinen tried to pass Berger and spun into Brundle's path. Brundle was forced to spin to avoid a collision and both rejoined without losing places, with Häkkinen staying ahead. Senna won ahead of new world champion Mansell, Berger, Häkkinen, Brundle and Capelli scoring his last point for Ferrari as well as the last point of his career.

Race classification

Championship standings after the race
Bold text indicates the World Champions.

Drivers' Championship standings

Constructors' Championship standings

References

Hungarian Grand Prix
Hungarian Grand Prix
Grand Prix
Hungarian Grand Prix